Jeffrey Richard Kling is the research director at the Congressional Budget Office, and was previously the associate director for economic analysis. Kling is also a faculty research fellow at the National Bureau of Economic Research and a senior investigator for the long-term evaluation of the Moving to Opportunity randomized housing mobility experiment.

Career 
He previously served as deputy director of the Economic Studies Program and Joseph A. Pechman Senior Fellow at The Brookings Institution (2005–09). He also previously served as an assistant professor in the Department of Economics and Woodrow Wilson School of Public and International Affairs at Princeton University (1998–2005), Special Assistant to the U.S. Secretary of Labor (1993), and assistant to the Chief Economist at The World Bank (1992–93).

Selected bibliography

Books

Papers

References

21st-century American economists
Living people
Behavioral economists
Neuroeconomists
Harvard College alumni
MIT School of Humanities, Arts, and Social Sciences alumni
Year of birth missing (living people)